Enzo Jeremías Fernández (born 17 January 2001) is an Argentine professional footballer who plays as a central midfielder for Premier League club Chelsea and the Argentina national team.  

As an academy graduate of River Plate, Fernández made his first-team debut for the club in 2019, before spending two seasons on loan with Defensa y Justicia. There, he enjoyed a successful campaign which culminated in him winning the Copa Sudamericana and Recopa Sudamericana, before returning to River Plate in 2021. Following his return, Fernández established himself as an integral player for the club, and won the 2021 Argentine Primera División. He joined Portuguese Primeira Liga side Benfica in the summer of 2022. Having played only six months for Benfica, he was purchased by Premier League club Chelsea in January 2023 for a British-record transfer fee.

An Argentine international, Fernández previously represented his country at under-18 level before making his senior international debut. He represented Argentina at the 2022 FIFA World Cup, playing an important role in helping his country win their third title, while also winning the tournament's Young Player Award.

Club career

River Plate

Early career 
Born in San Martín, Buenos Aires, to Raúl and Marta; Fernández has four brothers, Seba, Rodri, Maxi and Gonza. He was introduced to football at a young age, playing for a local side called Club La Recova, before joining River Plate. It is unclear exactly when Fernández joined River Plate; in November 2019, in an interview for the River Plate website, he claimed to have joined the academy in 2005, in September 2020, Argentine newspaper Clarín reported that he joined River in 2006, while in February 2023, he claimed he was six when he joined in an interview for the Chelsea website, which would have most likely been in 2007.

He progressed through the youth ranks, and was promoted into the club's first-team by manager Marcelo Gallardo on 27 January 2019, in a 3–1 home loss to Patronato in the Primera División, despite remaining on the bench. He made his first-team debut on 4 March 2020, replacing Santiago Sosa in the 75th minute of a 3–0 loss to L.D.U. Quito in the Copa Libertadores. In the weeks prior, he scored once, in the 6–1 thrashing of Libertad, in four games at the 2020 U-20 Copa Libertadores in Paraguay.

2020–21: Loan to Defensa y Justicia 
Despite being sporadically used Fernández's manager advised him to leave the club on loan, in order to continue his development. In August, Fernández was loaned to fellow top-flight club Defensa y Justicia. He made his debut for the Halcón on 18 September by manager Hernán Crespo in a 3–0 win over Delfín in the Copa Libertadores. Despite initially not being a starter, his performances impressed his manager and eventually he earned a place in the team, helping the club win the 2020 Copa Sudamericana, starting in the 3–0 win over fellow Argentinian side Lanús in the final, winning his first career title.

2021–22: First-team breakthrough 
After impressing on loan, Fernández returned to River Plate, during the season at the request of manager Marcelo Gallardo, making his return on 15 July 2021, in the first leg of Copa Libertadores round-of-16, featuring in the 1–1 home draw to fellow Argentinian side Argentinos Juniors. He immediately became a starter and on 14 August, he scored his first goal for the club and provided an assist in a 2–0 win over Vélez Sarsfield in the Primera División. On 20 December, he agreed to a contract extension to 2025. Following a promising start in the 2022 season, which he scored eight goals and provided six assists in 19 games, Fernández was named the best active footballer in Argentina, being subsequently scouted by a number of established European teams.

Benfica 

On 23 June 2022, River Plate reached an agreement with Primeira Liga team Benfica for the transfer of Fernández for a €10 million fee for 75% of his economic rights plus €8 million in add-ons, but with the player remaining at River Plate until the end of the club's Copa Libertadores campaign. Following River Plate's round of 16 exit from the Copa Libertadores, on 14 July, Benfica confirmed the deal, being given the number 13 shirt, previously worn by club legend Eusébio.

He made his debut for the club on 2 August, scoring his first goal for the club, a half-volley from outside the penalty area, in a 4–1 home win over Midtjylland in the first leg of the 2022–23 UEFA Champions League third qualifying round. He then scored in Benfica's next matches: a 4–0 home win over Arouca in the Primeira Liga, and a 3–1 away win over Midtjylland in the second leg of the UEFA Champions League third qualifying round. His impressive performances continued throughout the month and following a run of five consecutive wins and three clean sheets, he was named the Primeira Liga's Midfielder of the Month, a feat which was repeated for the months of October and November. He was linked with a move to Chelsea in the January 2023 transfer window, and the club was adamant he wouldn't be sold for less than his €121m release clause.

Chelsea 
Chelsea purchased Fernández for a package worth £106.8 million after a final agreement was reached on 31 January 2023, between the two clubs. He signed an eight-and-a-half-year contract, valid until 2031. Negotiations lasted for more than ten hours and were led by Chelsea co-owner Behdad Eghbali. The fee paid by Chelsea is now a British-record transfer deal, and Benfica received an initial £30 million installment which will be followed by five further payments.

He made his debut in the Premier League on 3 February at home against Fulham and played 90 minutes. On 11 February, Enzo registered an assist for the team's only goal in a 1–1 league draw at West Ham United.

International career 
On 24 July 2019, Fernández was selected by the Argentina U18s manager Esteban Solari to represent his nation at the 2019 COTIF Tournament in Spain. On 3 November 2021, he was called up by Argentina national team manager Lionel Scaloni for two 2022 FIFA World Cup qualifiers against Brazil and Uruguay. He made his senior team debut on 24 September 2022, by coming on as a 64th-minute substitute for Leandro Paredes in a 3–0 win against Honduras.

On 11 November, he was named in Argentina's 26-man squad for the 2022 FIFA World Cup. After coming on for Guido Rodríguez in the 57th minute, on 26 November, Fernández scored his first international goal, closing Argentina's 2–0 group stage win against Mexico.
In doing so, he became the second youngest player ever (only behind Lionel Messi) to score a World Cup goal for Argentina at 21 years, ten months and thirteen days old. On 3 December, he achieved a rather not so famous record, becoming the youngest own goal scorer in the history of Argentina in the FIFA World Cup, in the round of sixteen match against Australia, when his attempt to block Craig Goodwin's shot deflected into his team's net as Argentina beat Australia 2–1. After defeating Croatia 3–0 in the semi-final, Fernández played in the final against France, where Argentina won the World Cup by a score of 4–2 on penalties. He was named the best young player of the tournament.

Style of play 
Fernández usually plays as a deep-seated playmaking central midfielder, responsible for breaking up play, dictating the tempo, and recycling possession, while he is also a capable attacking midfielder. Although he prefers operating centrally, he can be seen occupying the left half-space assisted by a defensive midfield partner, like his former Benfica team-mate, Florentino Luís.

Fernández plays quick short passes, accurate long passes, and lobbed balls. He is combative in his midfield duels, protects spaces and his backline efficiently, possesses good passing range and vision. He can dribble into dangerous territory or out of it. He thrives in receiving the ball in tight spaces and is press-resistant. He is adept at breaking defensive lines with his passes, playing through balls, as well as recycling possession in the midfield. Out of possession, Fernández looks to proactively disrupt opposition attack, anticipate and intercept passes.

Personal life 
Fernández is named after three-time Copa América winner and former River Plate player Enzo Francescoli, due to his father Raúl's fascination with the Uruguayan footballer.

Fernández is married to fellow Argentine Valentina Cervantes, with whom he has a daughter, born in 2020.

Career statistics

Club

International 

 Scores and results list Argentina's goal tally first, score column indicates score after each Fernández goal

Honours 
Defensa y Justicia
 Copa Sudamericana: 2020
 Recopa Sudamericana: 2021

River Plate
 Argentine Primera División: 2021

Argentina
 FIFA World Cup: 2022

Individual
 CONMEBOL Copa Sudamericana Squad of the Season: 2020
 Primeira Liga Midfielder of the Month: August 2022, October/November 2022
 FIFA World Cup Young Player Award: 2022

Notes

References

External links 

 Profile at the Chelsea F.C. website
 

2001 births
Living people
People from San Martín, Buenos Aires
Sportspeople from Buenos Aires Province
Argentine footballers
Association football midfielders
Club Atlético River Plate footballers
Defensa y Justicia footballers
S.L. Benfica footballers
Argentine Primera División players
Primeira Liga players
Argentina youth international footballers
Argentina international footballers
2022 FIFA World Cup players
FIFA World Cup-winning players
Premier League players
Chelsea F.C. players
Argentine expatriate footballers
Argentine expatriate sportspeople in Portugal
Argentine expatriate sportspeople in England
Expatriate footballers in Portugal
Expatriate footballers in England